Oakham United may refer to:

 Oakham United F.C. (Nottinghamshire) (1969–1996)
 Oakham United F.C. (Rutland) (founded 2011)